Jenny Karin Olsson (14 July 1979 – 15 April 2012) was a Swedish cross-country skier. Her greatest international success was a fifth place in the 15 km race at the 2003 World championships in Val di Fiemme.

She also competed for Sweden at the 2002 Winter Olympics in Salt Lake City. Her best World cup season was 2002/2003 when she ended at a 23d place overall. She won several gold medals at the Swedish championships where she competed for her club Åsarna IK.

Death
In 2005, Olsson was diagnosed with breast cancer and ended her skiing career the following year. She died on 15 April 2012, aged 32. She was survived by her husband and their two-year-old son.

Cross-country skiing results
All results are sourced from the International Ski Federation (FIS).

Olympic Games

World Championships

a.  Cancelled due to extremely cold weather.

World Cup

Season standings

Team podiums

1 podium – (1 )

References

1979 births
2012 deaths
Olympic cross-country skiers of Sweden
Swedish female cross-country skiers
Deaths from cancer in Sweden
Cross-country skiers at the 2002 Winter Olympics
Deaths from breast cancer
People from Tumba, Sweden
20th-century Swedish women